"Ride It On"/"Lions After Slumber" is a 7"split single by Delays and The Veils, released in November 2003 to promote the album Stop Me If You Think You've Heard This One Before... a compilation of interpretations by current Rough Trade bands of classic songs released by the label.

Track listing 

 7" (RTRADES153)
 "Ride It On" (Delays, originally by Mazzy Star) – 3:28
 "Lions After Slumber" (The Veils, originally by Scritti Politti) – 3:30

Delays songs
The Veils songs
2003 singles